An ultra-low-cost personal computer (ULCPC) is an inexpensive personal computer such as a netbook or a nettop. It is most often used by Microsoft to define a class of computers which are eligible for special licensing and discounts. For example, the availability of Windows XP has been extended and discounts are offered for ULCPCs. Microsoft have recently been relaxing the definition to include larger displays (up to 14.1") and touchscreens.

References

Personal computers